Karl Brugger (1941, Munich – January 3, 1984, Rio de Janeiro) was a German foreign correspondent for the ARD network and author, best known for his book The Chronicle of Akakor about the alleged lost city of Akakor that was published in 1976.

Biography 
Brugger was born in Munich and studied journalism and contemporary history there and in Paris. On March 3, 1972, when Brugger was at the time a correspondent in Rio, in a tavern of Manaus, the Graças a Deus, met Tatunca Nara, an Indian "cacique", allegedly called the "Prince of Akakor". Brugger worked as a freelance journalist before being, from 1974, correspondent for the ARD. Brugger had later moved to Brazil.

Death
Brugger was killed in Rio de Janeiro on 3 January 1984 after being shot several times, while walking with his friend Ulrich Encke on the Ipanema beach. Neither his killer, nor the motive for his killing is known. A man named Wolfgang Seibenhaar had thoroughly investigated the mystery of Brugger's murder and was also questioned to if he knew anything about it, but was unable to find out or give any information. It was also believed that his murder was a robbery, but it is now believed it was not, as nothing was said to have been taken from Brugger.

See also
List of unsolved murders

References 

1941 births
1984 deaths
ARD (broadcaster) people
Deaths by firearm in Brazil
German male journalists
German male writers
German people murdered abroad
Journalists from Munich
Male murder victims
People murdered in Rio de Janeiro
Unsolved murders in Brazil